Aquilula is a genus of flowering plants belonging to the family Asteraceae. It contains a singles species, Aquilula riskindii.

Its native range is Northeastern Mexico.

References

Astereae
Monotypic Asteraceae genera